WBTL is a broadcast radio station licensed to Highland Springs, Virginia, serving Metro Richmond. WBTL is owned and operated by Mike Mazursky, through licensee Mobile Radio Partners, Inc.

About
WBTL currently offers a variety of classic pop, rock, and soul music brought to the Richmond area by live DJs. The current format also aims to be locally based by highlighting different businesses in the community via the "Radio Shopping Show" presented during the week from 10 in the morning to noon. This show pairs with local businesses to provide advertisements and gift certificates at reduced prices. WBTL can be reached via phone at (804)741-8946.

WBTL currently offers music selections curated by Big Mike, Mike in the Morning/Mike in the Mid Day, Ron Moody of Ron and the Centaurs, as well as Jim Conlee. WBTL offers a variety of voices for their listeners with tracks from various decades focusing on music from the 60's to the 80's.

History
On November 9, 2015, the then-WREJ went silent (off the air). Its previous black gospel format moved to sister station WLEE 990 AM, replacing news/talk.

On February 4, 2016, WREJ swapped call signs with its sister station, assuming the WLEE call sign. The station changed its call sign to WONA on March 15, 2016.

Effective June 28, 2016, Davidson Media Group donated WONA to the Delmarva Educational Association.

On October 31, 2017, Mobile Radio Partners, Inc. finalized the purchase of WONA from Delmarva Educational Association, at a price of $25,000. They changed the station's call letters to WBTL on the same day. On November 6, 2017, WBTL returned to the air with rhythmic oldies, branded as "U Win Radio" (simulcasting WUWN 1450 AM Highland Springs).

On March 14, 2018, WBTL and WUWN changed format from rhythmic oldies to oldies, branded as "Boomtown Radio".

WBTL changed its call sign to WULT on August 27, 2018 (with WUWN picking up the WBTL calls). The station also moved its community of license from Richmond to Sandston. The station changed back to the WBTL call sign on September 11, 2018.

Previous logo

References

External links
https://www.boomtownrichmond.com/
https://mytuner-radio.com/radio/boomtown-radio-453106/
https://radio-locator.com/info/WBTL-AM
https://transition.fcc.gov/fcc-bin/amq?call=WBTL
https://www.fmradiofree.com/boomtown-radio

BTL (AM)
Radio stations established in 1964
1964 establishments in Virginia
Oldies radio stations in the United States